Carl Per Gunnar Gahrton (born 2 February 1943 in Malmö) is a Swedish politician. He was a Member of Parliament, holding a seat for the Liberal Party from 1976 to 1979, and for the Green Party from 1988 to 1991, and again in 1994-95. Later, he was a Member of the European Parliament from 1995 to 2004.

Early in his career, Gahrton was elected chairman of the youth and student wing of the Swedish Liberal Party, in 1969. In 1971 he was challenged for the post by Lars Leijonborg due to ideological tensions; Leijonborg succeeded him after a narrow win. Gahrton entered in 1976 as a Member of Parliament for the Liberal Party. He was re-elected in 1979 but left the parliament and the party the same year, expressing disenchantment with the parliament bureaucracy. Turning to the nascent Green Party, in the 1980s he was one of its founders in 1981 and one of its more high-profile men for many years, one of relatively few in the new party who had several years of prior experience of professional politics before joining; he served as one of two spokespersons for the party from 1984 to 1985. He also served as a Member of Parliament for the Green Party from 1988 to 1991 and again from 1994 to 1995. From 1995 to 2004 he was a Member of the European Parliament. He is an outspoken eurosceptic and was one of the leading proponents of the "no"-side in the 1994 Swedish European Union membership referendum (which was won by the "yes"-side).

Gahrton currently serves as President of the Swedish Association for Solidarity with Palestine.
 
In December 2008, Gahrton sharply criticized the a European Union proposal ”Guidelines for strengthening the political dialogue structures with Israel” arguing that the guidelines in fact were meant to establish "a Security Pact with Israel." He also argued that due to "the well-known Israeli skill in lobbying and in influencing opinions worldwide, it is no exaggeration to argue that from now on and for all practical purposes the Middle East Policy of the EU will be elaborated, even co-written, by Israel."

In March 2009, Gahrton participated in a large protest against the Davis Cup match between Sweden and Israel in Malmo. Under orders from local politicians, the match was played behind closed doors. Gahrton claimed that this decision had already given demonstrators some success, stating that "We have been helped by brave politicians in Malmö. We thank them for that."

Gahrton is the author of "Life and Death in the European Parliament", part political thriller, part tell-all memoir. The book was criticized by fellow parliament members as being a thinly disguised rip-off of Dan Brown's "The Da Vinci Code", which dominated Sweden's best seller lists at the time, and Gahrton accused of wanting to cash in on Brown's success. Consequently, Gahrton was forced to distribute the book free of charge.

Gahrton has described himself as Jewish according to the traditional Jewish definition, as his matrilineal family, viz. his maternal grandmother's mother, was Jewish.

Books
Life and Death in the European Parliament. Books-on-demand, Visby 2004
Georgia: Pawn in the New Political Game. Pluto Press, May 2010

References

Living people
Politicians from Malmö
Members of the Riksdag from the Liberals (Sweden)
Members of the Riksdag from the Green Party
21st-century Swedish novelists
Swedish people of Jewish descent
Green Party (Sweden) MEPs
MEPs for Sweden 1995–1999
MEPs for Sweden 1999–2004
Swedish male novelists
1943 births